Mariangela Perrupato (born 15 September 1988) is an Italian synchronized swimmer. She competed in the women's duet with Giulia Lapi at the 2012 Summer Olympics, finishing in 7th place.  She was part of the Italian team in the team event at the 2016 Summer Olympics finishing 5th.

Biography
She began synchronised swimming at the age of 6.  She made her senior international debut for Italy in 2006 at the European Championships in Budapest, where she won bronze in the duet.  She had already won medals at junior level, winning a silver in the team event at the 2004 European Junior Synchronised Swimming Championships in Osweicim.  In November 2016, she suffered a herniated disc.

Perrupato an athlete of the Gruppo Sportivo Fiamme Oro.

References

1988 births
Living people
Sportspeople from the Province of Cosenza
Italian synchronized swimmers
Olympic synchronized swimmers of Italy
Synchronized swimmers at the 2012 Summer Olympics
Synchronized swimmers at the 2016 Summer Olympics
World Aquatics Championships medalists in synchronised swimming
Synchronized swimmers at the 2017 World Aquatics Championships
Synchronized swimmers at the 2015 World Aquatics Championships
Synchronized swimmers at the 2013 World Aquatics Championships
Synchronized swimmers at the 2011 World Aquatics Championships
Synchronized swimmers at the 2009 World Aquatics Championships
Synchronized swimmers at the 2007 World Aquatics Championships
European Aquatics Championships medalists in synchronised swimming
Artistic swimmers of Fiamme Oro